Tsirekidze is a Georgian surname. It may refer to
Irakli Tsirekidze (born 1982), Georgian judoka
Rauli Tsirekidze (born 1987), Georgian weightlifter
Revaz Tsirekidze (born 1934), Georgian fencer
Sandro Tsirekidze (1894–1923), Georgian poet

Georgian-language surnames